The Slovenia women's national football team represents Slovenia in international women's football competition and is controlled by the Football Association of Slovenia. They played their first match in 1993 after the split of Socialist Federal Republic of Yugoslavia in 1991. Before that, Slovenian players played for the Yugoslav national team.

History

Slovenia made its official debut on 25 September 1993 against England in the qualifying for the 1995 European Championship. They lost all six qualifiers with a 0–60 goal average, including a record 17–0 loss against Spain. After this Slovenia didn't take part in official competitions for more than a decade.

They returned in 2005 for the 2007 World Cup qualification, where they didn't have options to qualify since back then a two-division format with promotions and relegations was held and they started in the lower category. For the 2009 European Championship the two divisions were merged into one, and Slovenia made it to the play-offs as one of the four best 3rd-ranked teams, their biggest success to date. There they were knocked out by Ukraine by a 0–5 aggregate.

In the 2011 World Cup and 2013 European Championship qualifiers Slovenia ended fourth out of five teams, with 6 and 4 points respectively.

All-time results

Results and fixtures

 The following is a list of match results in the last 12 months, as well as any future matches that have been scheduled.

Legend

2022

2023

Coaching staff

Current coaching staff

Manager history

As of December 2020

Players

Current squad
 The following players were named in the squad for a friendly match against Croatia on 12 June 2021.
 Caps and goals correct as of 12 June 2021, after the Croatia match.

Recent call-ups
 The following players were named to a squad in the last 12 months.
Caps and goals may be incorrect.

Notes:
 Position legend: GK=goalkeeper; DF=Defender; MF=Midfielder; FW=Forward.

Captains

Mateja Zver (????–)

Records

 Active players in bold, statistics correct as of 2020.

Most capped players

Top goalscorers

Competitive record

FIFA Women's World Cup

*Draws include knockout matches decided on penalty kicks.

UEFA Women's Championship

*Draws include knockout matches decided on penalty kicks.

See also

Sport in Slovenia
Football in Slovenia
Women's football in Slovenia
Slovenia men's national football team

References

External links
 Official website
 FIFA profile

 
European women's national association football teams
Women